Bernhard Horwitz (1807 in Neustrelitz – 1885 in London) was a German and British chess master, chess writer and chess composer.

Horwitz was born in Neustrelitz and went to school in Berlin, where he studied art. From 1837 to 1843, he was part of a group of German chess players known as "The Pleiades".

He moved to London in 1845, where he became a British citizen. In 1846, he lost a match against visiting master Lionel Kieseritzky, and another against Howard Staunton, losing 15.5–8.5. His best chess result was winning a match against Henry Bird in 1851. He played in the first international chess tournament, London 1851, again beating Bird in the first round, but losing to Staunton in the second and József Szén in the third.

Horwitz's Chess Studies (1851), co-authored with Josef Kling, is an important work on the endgame study and endgames in general.

"Horwitz bishops", a configuration in which two bishops are aggressively placed on adjacent diagonals, are named after Horwitz.

The Kling and Horwitz Defensive Technique enables Black to force a draw with Black to move against perfect play in the diagram shown to the right. For a detailed analysis of this position, see here.Horwitz died in 1885 and was buried on the eastern side of Highgate Cemetery.

See also
 List of Jewish chess players

References

See also
 List of Jewish chess players

External links
 

1807 births
1885 deaths
Burials at Highgate Cemetery
People from Neustrelitz
19th-century German Jews
German chess players
German emigrants to the United Kingdom
British chess players
Jewish chess players
Chess composers
Chess theoreticians
German chess writers
British chess writers
People from Mecklenburg-Strelitz
German male non-fiction writers
British Jewish writers
19th-century chess players